Kronos can refer to:

Cronus, a Titan, the father of Zeus, Poseidon, Hades, Hestia, Demeter, and Hera

Arts and entertainment

Film and television 
Kronos (film), a 1957 science fiction film
Captain Kronos – Vampire Hunter, a 1974 horror film 
Kronos (Highlander), a fictional character
In the Doctor Who serial, The Time Monster, a creature from outside time that feeds on time itself
In the Star Trek universe, another spelling of Qo'noS, the Klingon home world
In Singularity, an artificial intelligence designed to rid the earth of the plague of humanity in order to save the planet.
Operation Kronos, a fictional project in the 2004 Disney/Pixar superhero animated film The Incredibles

Video games 
In Age of Mythology: The Titans, a character with the ability to time-shift buildings
In Eve Online, a Marauder Class battleship based on a Gallente Federation Megathron hull
Kronos II, an Orbital Mining Facility on the rings of Saturn in 2126 in Lone Echo

Other media
Kronos (band), a death metal band from France
Kronos Quartet, a string quartet founded by violinist David Harrington in 1973

Businesses and organizations
 Kronos Digital Entertainment, a video game developer
 Kronos Incorporated, a workforce management software and hardware company
 Khronos Group, an American non-profit member-funded industry consortium maintaining the OpenGL standard
 Kronos Foods, a manufacturer of gyros
 , a chemical company and producer of titanium dioxide based in Dallas 
 Kronos Racing, a Belgian rally team

Science and technology

Computing
 Kronos (computer), a 32-bit graphical workstation developed in the Soviet Union in the mid-1980s
 Kronos (malware), banking malware first reported in 2014
 CDC Kronos, an operating system with time-sharing capabilities, written by the Control Data Corporation in the 1970s

Other uses in science and technology
 Kronos (spacecraft), a proposed space mission to Saturn
 Kronos (star), a star that is in a wide binary system with Krios, and which has eaten some terrestrial planets
 Korg Kronos, a music workstation synthesizer

Other uses 
 Kronos: A Journal of Interdisciplinary Synthesis, published between 1975 and 1988

See also
 Cronus (disambiguation)
 Chronos (disambiguation)
 Khronos (disambiguation)
 Cronos (disambiguation)